Stanley Bertram Chrimes (February 23, 1907 in Sidcup, Kent, England - July 21, 1984 in Penarth, Glamorgan, Wales) was head of the department of history at University College, Cardiff, University of Wales, and a noted biographer of Henry VII of England. He taught at the University of Glasgow from 1937 to 1952.

Personal life
Chrimes married Mabel Keyser on June 8, 1937, and remained together until his death. The couple had no children.

Selected publications
Sir John Fortescue, De Laudibus Legum Anglie, University Press, Cambridge, 1942. Edited and translated with introduction and notes by S.B. Chrimes.
English constitutional history, Oxford University Press, Oxford, 1947. (Home University Library of Modern Knowledge No. 199)
The general election in Glasgow, February, 1950: Essays by members of the staff of the University of Glasgow, Jackson, Son & Co., Glasgow, 1950.
An introduction to the administrative history of mediaeval England, Blackwell, Oxford, 1952. (Studies in mediaeval history series No. 7)
Select documents of English constitutional history, 1307-1485, A.& C.Black, London, 1961. (With Alfred Lawson Brown)
Lancastrians,Yorkists and Henry VII, Macmillan, London, 1964.
Henry VII, Methuen, London, 1972. (Now published in the Yale English Monarchs series)

References

External links 
 Papers of Prof. Stanley Bertram Chrimes (1907-1984), historian Archives Hub; retrieved November 6, 2021

1907 births
1984 deaths
Alumni of King's College London
Alumni of Trinity College, Cambridge
Academics of the University of Glasgow
Academics of the University of Wales